The  was a Bo-Bo wheel arrangement AC electric locomotive type operated by Japanese National Railways (JNR) in Kyushu, Japan, between 1962 and the 1980s.

Design
The Class ED73 design was broadly derived from the Class ED72 locomotives introduced a year earlier, but as the Class ED73 was primarily intended for use on freight services, it did not include a steam generator for train heating, and was therefore  shorter than the Bo-2-Bo wheel arrangement Class ED72. The DT119B bogies were also almost identical to those used on the full-production Class ED72 locomotives.

History
A total of 22 locomotives were built by Toshiba between 1962 and 1963. The first locomotives were delivered to Moji Depot in northern Kyushu.

In the late 1960s, the entire class was modified with improved braking performance for use on express freight services, and the locomotives were renumbered in the ED73 10xx series. The locomotive numbers were painted yellow at this time. In later years, the class was also used on overnight sleeping car services, as these trains did not require steam heating.

The class was withdrawn by the early 1980s. No examples of the class have been preserved.

Classification

The ED73 classification for this locomotive type is explained below.
 E: Electric locomotive
 D: Four driving axles
 7x: AC locomotive with maximum speed exceeding

References

Electric locomotives of Japan
Bo-Bo locomotives
Toshiba locomotives
1067 mm gauge locomotives of Japan
Railway locomotives introduced in 1962